Strain is the third studio album by American industrial group, Flesh Field, which was released on November 8, 2004 on Metropolis Records. This is not only Flesh Field's debut album on Metropolis Records, but this is also their first album that features the vocals of Wendy Yanko after the departure of Rian Miller.

Track listing

Personnel
Ian Ross - All Instruments, Songwriting, Mixing
Wendy Yanko - Vocals
Ted Phelps - Mastering, Guest vocals on "Voice of Dissent"
Josh Creamer - Guitar on "This Broken Dream"
James Stepp - Bass guitar on "This Broken Dream"
Margaret Faye - Female backing vocals on "Haven", "Amoeba", and "Epiphany"
Switch - Album artwork

References

2004 albums